Family Man is an American sitcom which aired on ABC from March 18 to April 29, 1988. It starred Richard Libertini as a middle-aged comedy writer married to a much younger wife (Mimi Kennedy), and focused on the trials and tribulations he faced raising two stepchildren and one biological child. The series was created by Earl Pomerantz.

Synopsis
Shelly Tobin (Libertini) was a balding, good-natured comedy writer in his fifties who found that his personal life provided just as much witty fodder as his professional. He had married later in life to his wife, Andrea (Kennedy), who was fifteen years his junior. Shelly had experienced instant fatherhood upon their union, with Andrea having brought in two kids from her previous marriage, the now-teenage Rosie (Alison Sweeney) and nine-year-old Josh (Whitby Hertford); eventually, Shelly and Andrea produced a child together, three-year-old Sara (Keeley Mari Gallagher). With children in all different age groups, with Rosie and Josh  in their (respectively) adolescent and mischievous stages especially, Shelly continued to navigate through the basics of parenting the best he could. He faced the real challenges with a combination of bewilderment and intelligent humor as he tried to make sense of the process. Andrea provided the calm voice of reason, and despite her longer tenure as a parent, would continually remind Shelly that she, too, would still deal with the unknown.

Production 
The living room set was a reproduction of the Pomerantz's own living room in Pacific Palisades, California. The facade of the house in the show opening was that of his house and the backdrop of a view of the Pacific Ocean was based on the view from his home. Every story of the eleven episodes written was based on something that had happened to Pomerantz as a child or as an adult. Because Pomerantz wanted more than the usual 3 sets used for a multi-camera show with a live audience, the show was shot on seven sets as a multi-camera show but without a live audience. The program was titled "Our House" while it was under development but changed when NBC declined to pick it up. When interviewed on the Hollywood and Levine podcast in 2018 Pomerantz said that he had videotapes of the seven episodes that were produced stored in his garage but that he had no interest in seeing them digitized and shared.

Cast
Richard Libertini as Shelly Tobin
Mimi Kennedy as Andrea Tobin
Alison Sweeney as Rosie Tobin 
Whitby Hertford as Josh Tobin
Keeley Mari Gallagher as Sara Tobin

Episodes

Broadcast

Family Man was a midseason replacement on ABC's Friday night lineup for the spring of 1988, airing at 9:30/8:30c following Mr. Belvedere. It was one of many ABC comedies that were either moved to, or tried out on, Friday nights during the 1987-88 TV season, replacing Sledge Hammer! in its time slot (which went on another hiatus at that point). With only seven episodes ordered, the series aired until April 29, 1988 and was not picked up for another season.

Jesse Frederick and connections to Miller/Boyett
The series' vocal opening theme was performed by Jesse Frederick, best known for his singing and scoring work on shows from Miller/Boyett Productions (which did not produce this series). Frederick's vocal style was more subdued on Family Man than on the shows he is most recognized for, including Full House, which aired on ABC's Friday night lineup along with this series, and Family Matters, among others.

After the cancellation of Family Man, Whitby Hertford surfaced on the Miller/Boyett co-production Full House as Walter Burman, a nerdy classmate of Stephanie Tanner (Jodie Sweetin), for three episodes during the 1989–90 season.

This series is not to be confused with the similarly titled sitcom The Family Man, which was produced by Miller/Boyett Productions and aired on CBS for one season (1990-1991). Frederick also composed the theme music and scoring for The Family Man.

References
 Brooks, Tim; Marsh, Earle. The Complete Directory to Prime Time Network and Cable TV Shows, Random House, 2003. 

1988 American television series debuts
1988 American television series endings
1980s American sitcoms
American Broadcasting Company original programming
English-language television shows
Television shows set in Los Angeles
Television series about families
Television series by Universal Television